Orom is a village in Serbia. It is situated in the Kanjiža municipality, in the North Banat District, Vojvodina province. The village has a Hungarian ethnic majority (94.23%), with a population of 1,561 people (2002 census).

Historical population

1961: 3,002
1971: 2,552
1981: 2,007
1991: 1,912
2002: 1,561

See also
List of places in Serbia
List of cities, towns and villages in Vojvodina

References
 Slobodan Ćurčić, Broj stanovnika Vojvodine, Novi Sad, 1996.

External links
 History of Orom 

Places in Bačka